Kanakpur Part-II is a census town in Cachar district in the Indian state of Assam.

Demographics
 India census, Kanakpur Part-II had a population of 7089. There are 4817 males and 4702 females. Kanakpur Part-II has an average literacy rate of 88.95%, higher than the national average of 74.04%: male literacy is 91.99%, and female literacy is 85.82%. In Kanakpur Part-II, 1121 persons are under 6 years of age.

References

Cities and towns in Cachar district
Silchar